Sree Dandu Mariamman Temple, in Shivajinagar (also called Shivajinagara) in Bangalore city, is dedicated to the deity Mariamman (the Hindu god Shakthi or Parvathi).

References 

Hindu temples in Bangalore
Mariamman temples
Devi temples in Karnataka